Gábor Balog (born 2 September 1990 in Békéscsaba) is a Hungarian swimmer, who competed at the 2008, 2012 and 2016 Summer Olympics.

At the 2008 Summer Olympics, he competed in the men's 200 metre backstroke only.  At the 2012 Summer Olympics, he competed in the Men's 200 metre backstroke, finishing in 5th place overall in the heats, and 5th place in his semifinal, failing to make the final.  He also competed as part of the Hungarian men's  freestyle relay team.  At the 2016 Summer Olympics, he competed in different events, the 100 m backstroke and the  medley relay.

References

1990 births
Living people
Hungarian male swimmers
Olympic swimmers of Hungary
Swimmers at the 2008 Summer Olympics
Swimmers at the 2012 Summer Olympics
Swimmers at the 2016 Summer Olympics
European Aquatics Championships medalists in swimming
Male backstroke swimmers
People from Békéscsaba
Sportspeople from Békés County
20th-century Hungarian people
21st-century Hungarian people
Competitors at the 2022 World Games
World Games gold medalists